Niepołomice Royal Castle is a Gothic castle from the mid-14th century, rebuilt in the late Renaissance style and called the second Wawel. It is situated in Niepołomice, Poland and was extensively reconstructed in the 1990s.

Niepołomice Castle was built by order of King Casimir III the Great on the slope of the Vistula valley, to serve as a retreat during hunting expeditions to the nearby Niepołomice Forest. The castle consisted of three towers, buildings in the southern and eastern wing, and curtain walls surrounding a courtyard. Sigismund I the Old rebuilt the structure, giving it the form of a quadrangle with an internal courtyard. Queen Bona Sforza's gardens were located on the southern flank. In 1550 a great fire destroyed the east and north wings. Reconstruction works were conducted in 1551-1568 under the supervision of Tomasz Grzymała and a sculptor Santi Gucci. At the end of the 16th century the castle passed into the hands of the Curylo, Branicki and Lubomirski families. At that time, only small changes were made to the castle interiors (fireplaces, ceilings). Construction of an arcade courtyard began in 1635 and was completed in 1637.

The Swedish-Brandenburgian invasion in 1655 brought an end to the magnificence of the building. The castle was transformed into a food store during the occupation. In the 18th century it was acquired by King Augustus II the Strong and Augustus III. The reconstruction of the former royal residence began in 1991, when it became the property of Niepołomice Municipality.

See also 
 List of mannerist structures in Southern Poland
 Castles in Poland
 John Dee 1583 Castle meetup with King Stephen Báthory
 Jagiellonian tapestries also known as the Wawel arrasses

References

External links 

  Muzeum Niepołomickie

Castles in Lesser Poland Voivodeship
Museums in Lesser Poland Voivodeship
Residences of Polish monarchs
Royal residences in Poland
Wieliczka County
History of Lesser Poland